The Rivulariaceae are a family of cyanobacteria within the Nostocales in which the filaments (trichomes) are tapered from wider at the base to narrower at the tip.

The type species is Rivularia haematites (Dc) C. A. Agardh.

Genera 
, WoRMS listed the following genera under Rivulariaceae:
 Amphithrix Bornet & Flahault, 1886
 Ariasmontanoa Molinari & Guiry, 2021
 Calothrix C.Agardh ex Bornet & Flahault, 1886
 Dichothrix  Zanardini ex Bornet & Flahault, 1886
 Gaillardotella Bory de Saint-Vincent ex Kuntze, 1898
 Gardnerula G.De Toni, 1936
 Gloiotrichia J.Agardh, 1842
 Heteractis A.P.de Candolle, 1838
 Isactis Thuret ex Bornet & Flahault, 1886
 Macrochaete Berrendero, J.R.Johansen & Kastovsky, 2016
 Mastigonema H.Schwabe ex A.B.Frank, 1886
 Montanoa P.González, 1947
 Nunduva L.González-Resendiz, H.León-Tejera & J.R.Johansen, 2018
 Phyllonema D.O.Alvarenga, J.Rigonato, L.H.Z.Branco, I.S.Melo & M.F.Fiore, 2016
 Primorivularia A.-S.Edhorn, 1973
 Rivularia C.Agardh ex Bornet & Flahault, 1886
 Sacconema Borzì ex Bornet & Flahault, 1886: contains two species, one freshwater and another terrestrial;
 Tildenia Kossinskaja, 1926
 Zonotrichites J.G.Bornemann, 1886

，AlgaeBase also includes the following genera under Rivulariaceae:
 Microchaete Thuret ex Bornet & Flahault 1886: is considered by WoRMS to remain under the subfamily of Microchaetoideae of family Microchaetaceae.

References

External links

 Gallery of images
 In the Encyclopedia of Life, with reference list
 Distribution
 Integrated Taxonomic Information System

 
Cyanobacteria families